The name Quinta has been used for four tropical cyclones in the Philippines by the PAGASA in the Western Pacific Ocean.

 Typhoon Meari (2004) (T0421, 25W, Quinta) – made landfall on Kyūshū, Japan.
 Tropical Storm Maysak (2008) (T0819, 24W, Quinta-Siony) – affected the Philippines; Quinta was renamed as Siony.
 Tropical Storm Wukong (2012) (T1225, 27W, Quinta) – traversed the Philippines, causing flash flooding.
 Typhoon Molave (2020) (T2018, 21W, Quinta) - a powerful typhoon which devastated the Southern Luzon area of the Philippines and Vietnam.

The name Quinta was retired from use in the Philippine area of responsibility following the 2020 typhoon season, and will be replaced with Querubin in the 2024 season.

References

Pacific typhoon set index articles